Bone Hard Zaggin' is a limited edition (333 copies) vinyl EP release by Girl Talk released by 333 Recordings.

Track listing
Side A
"Pure Magic" – 3:32
Side B
"LC and Lo" – 3:06

See also
 Bastard Pop
 Illegal Art

External links
 Girl Talk on Illegal Art
 Girl Talk on MySpace

2006 EPs
Girl Talk (musician) albums
Remix EPs
2006 remix albums